Serine/threonine-protein kinase, Intestinal cell kinase or ICK is an enzyme that in humans is encoded by the ICK gene.

Eukaryotic protein kinases are enzymes that belong to a very extensive family of proteins which share a conserved catalytic core common with both serine/threonine and tyrosine protein kinases. This gene encodes an intestinal serine/threonine kinase harboring a dual phosphorylation site found in mitogen-activating protein (MAP) kinases. The protein localizes to the intestinal crypt region and is thought to be important in intestinal epithelial cell proliferation and differentiation. Alternative splicing has been observed at this locus and two variants, encoding the same isoform, have been identified.

References

Further reading